The 2000–01 FIBA SuproLeague was the FIBA European professional club basketball Champions' Cup for the 2000–01 season. Up until that season, there was one cup, the FIBA European Champions' Cup (which is now called the EuroLeague), though in this season of 2000–01, the leading European teams split into two competitions: the FIBA SuproLeague and Euroleague Basketball Company's Euroleague 2000–01.

The season started on 18 October 2000, and ended on 13 May 2001. The competition's Final Four took place at Palais Omnisports de Paris-Bercy, in Paris, France. The 2000–01 SuproLeague was the last European top tier club competition organised by FIBA.

European Champions' Cup teams divided

The European Champions' Cup was originally established by FIBA and it operated under its umbrella from 1958 until the summer of 2000, concluding with the 1999–2000 season. Euroleague Basketball was created on 1 July 2000.

FIBA had never trademarked the "EuroLeague" name and had no legal recourse on the usage of that name. Therefore, FIBA had to find a new name for their league and chose "SuproLeague". The 2000–01 season started with two top European professional club basketball competitions: the FIBA SuproLeague (renamed from the FIBA EuroLeague) and the brand new Euroleague.

Top clubs were split between the two leagues: Panathinaikos, Maccabi Tel Aviv, CSKA Moscow, and Efes Pilsen stayed with FIBA, while Olympiacos, Kinder Bologna, Real Madrid, FC Barcelona, Tau Cerámica, and Benetton Treviso joined Euroleague Basketball.

Competition system and format
20 teams (national domestic league champions, and runners-up from various national domestic leagues), playing in a tournament system.

The first phase was a regular season, in which the twenty competing teams were drawn into two groups, each containing ten teams. Each team played every other team in its group at home and away, resulting in 18 games for each team. The top 8 teams in each group advanced to the Round of 16, and the winners of this round advanced to the Quarterfinals. Both of the rounds were played in a Best-of-three playoff system. The winning teams of the Quarterfinals qualified to the SuproLeague Final Four, which was held in the Palais Omnisports de Paris-Bercy, in Paris, on 10–13 May 2001.

Teams

Regular season
If one or more clubs were level on won-lost record, tiebreakers were applied in the following order:
Head-to-head record in matches between the tied clubs
Overall point difference in games between the tied clubs
Overall point difference in all group matches (first tiebreaker if tied clubs were not in the same group)
Points scored in all group matches
Sum of quotients of points scored and points allowed in each group match

Group A

Group B

Round of 16

|}

Quarterfinals

|}

Final four

Bracket

Semifinals
11 May, Palais Omnisports de Paris-Bercy, Paris

|}

3rd place game
13 May, Palais Omnisports de Paris-Bercy, Paris

|}

Final
13 May, Palais Omnisports de Paris-Bercy, Paris

|}

Final standings

Awards

FIBA SuproLeague Top Scorer
 Miroslav Berić (Partizan)

FIBA SuproLeague Player of the Year
 Nate Huffman (Maccabi Tel Aviv)

FIBA SuproLeague Final Four MVP
 Ariel McDonald (Maccabi Tel Aviv)

FIBA SuproLeague Finals Top Scorer
 Dejan Bodiroga (Panathinaikos)

FIBA SuproLeague All-Final Four Team
 Ariel McDonald (Maccabi Tel Aviv; Final Four MVP)
 Anthony Parker (Maccabi Tel Aviv)
 Dejan Bodiroga (Panathinaikos)
 Andrei Kirilenko (CSKA Moscow)
 Nate Huffman (Maccabi Tel Aviv)

Two continental champions
In May 2001, Europe had two continental champions, Maccabi Tel Aviv of the FIBA SuproLeague and Kinder Bologna of Euroleague Basketball Company's EuroLeague. The leaders of both organizations realized the need to come up with a new single competition. Negotiating from the position of strength, Euroleague Basketball Company dictated proceedings and FIBA essentially had no choice but to agree to their terms. As a result, the EuroLeague was fully integrated under Euroleague Basketball Company's umbrella, and teams that competed in the FIBA SuproLeague during the 2000–01 season joined it as well. It is today officially admitted that European basketball had two champions that year, Maccabi of the FIBA SuproLeague and Kinder Bologna of the Euroleague Basketball Company's EuroLeague.

Formation of the Euroleague
A year later, Euroleague Basketball Company and FIBA decided that Euroleague Basketball's EuroLeague competition would be the main basketball tournament on the continent, to be played between the top-level teams of Europe. FIBA Europe would also organize a European league for third-tier level teams, known as the FIBA Europe League competition, while Euroleague Basketball would also organize its own second-tier level league, combining FIBA's long-time FIBA Saporta Cup and FIBA Korać Cup competitions into one new competition, the EuroCup. In 2005, Euroleague Basketball and FIBA decided to cooperate with each other and did so until 2016.

In essence, the authority in European professional basketball was divided over club-country lines. FIBA stayed in charge of national team competitions (like the FIBA EuroBasket, the FIBA World Cup, and the Summer Olympics), while Euroleague Basketball took over the European professional club competitions. From that point on, FIBA Saporta Cup and FIBA Korać Cup competitions lasted only one more season before folding, which was when Euroleague Basketball launched the EuroCup.

See also
2000–01 Euroleague
2000–01 FIBA Saporta Cup
2000–01 FIBA Korać Cup

References

External links
2000–01 FIBA SuproLeague
Eurobasket.com 2000–01 FIBA SuproLeague
2000–01 FIBA SuproLeague At The FIBA Europe Site

 
2000–01 in European basketball
2000-01